Blastodacna georgiella is a moth in the family Elachistidae. It is found in western Transcaucasia and Georgia.

The wingspan is 11–12 mm. Adults have been recorded from the beginning of June to mid July.

References

Moths described in 1988
Blastodacna